Fighting Norway is a 10-minute 1943 Canadian documentary, part of the Canada Carries On series of short films produced by the National Film Board of Canada. The film was directed by Sydney Newman, one of a number of shorts that were intended for theatrical release.

Synopsis 
The role of the free forces of occupied Norway during the Second World War is documented, especially the role of the Norwegian underground.

Canada offered haven to Norwegian troops at a "Little Norway" Norwegian Army Air Service/Royal Norwegian Air Force training camp in Ontario. The training of Norwegian air crew in Canada, and the relationships formed between servicemen of the two nations is emphasized.

Cast 
 Haakon VII as himself (archive footage)
 Vidkun Quisling as himself (archive footage)

Production 
Fighting Norway was produced in 1943, with financial backing from the Wartime Information Board. The documentary was created as a propaganda film during the Second World War, emphasizing the cooperation and collaboration of two allied countries.

The narrator was Lorne Greene, known for his work on both radio broadcasts as a news announcer at CBC as well as narrating many of the Canada Carries On series. His sonorous recitation led to his nickname, "The Voice of Canada", and to some observers, the "voice-of-God". When reading grim battle statistics or, as in Fighting Norway, narrating a particularly serious topic, he was "the Voice of Doom".  Some of the stock footage used had previously been used in the British documentary All for Norway (1942).

Reception 
As part of the Canada Carries On series, Fighting Norway was produced in 35 mm for the theatrical market. Each film was shown over a six-month period as part of the shorts or newsreel segments in approximately 800 theatres across Canada. The NFB had an arrangement with Famous Players theatres to ensure that Canadians from coast to coast could see the documentary series, with further distribution by Columbia Pictures. After the six-month theatrical tour ended, individual films were made available on 16 mm to schools, libraries, churches and factories, extending the life of these films for another year or two. They were also made available to film libraries operated by university and provincial authorities.

See also 
 List of Allied propaganda films of World War II
Norway in Revolt, a 1941 American newsreel short

References

Notes

Bibliography 

 Bennett, Linda Greene. My Father's Voice: The Biography of Lorne Greene. Bloomington, Indiana: iUniverse, Inc., 2004. .
 Ellis, Jack C. and  Betsy A. McLane. New History of Documentary Film. London: Continuum International Publishing Group, 2005. .
 Rist, Peter. Guide to the Cinema(s) of Canada. Westport, Connecticut: Greenwood Publishing Group, 2001. .
 Rowan, Terry. World War II Goes to the Movies & Television Guide. Santa Rosa, California: Terry Rowan, 2015. .

External links 
 Fighting Norway at the National Film Board of Canada.
 Fighting Norway at the Internet Movie Database.

1943 films
1943 short films
1943 documentary films
Canadian aviation films
Canadian black-and-white films
Canadian World War II propaganda films
Black-and-white documentary films
English-language Canadian films
National Film Board of Canada documentaries
Canadian short documentary films
Canada Carries On
Documentary films about Norway
Quebec films
Columbia Pictures short films
1940s short documentary films
Films directed by Sydney Newman
Norway in World War II
1940s Canadian films